Haine is a 1980 French drama film directed by Dominique Goult and starring Klaus Kinski.

Cast
 Klaus Kinski as Le motard
 Maria Schneider as Madeleine
 Patrice Melennec as Le camionneur
 Évelyne Bouix as La serveuse
 Katia Tchenko as La mère
 Paulette Frantz as La patronne du bistro
 Gérard Boucaron as Bingo
 Georges Werler as Le père
 Jean-Simon Prévost as Le maire
 Bernard Cazassus as Un paysan
 Jean-Pierre Laurent as Le patron du café

References

External links

1980 films
French drama films
1980s French-language films
1980 drama films
1980s French films